The Jack Welch Management Institute (JWMI) at Strayer University is a for-profit online educational institution based in the United States, owned by Strategic Education, Inc. It was founded in 2009 by Jack Welch, former CEO of General Electric and his wife, Suzy Welch, author and public speaker. JWMI offers an online executive Master of Business Administration degree, graduate certificates, and executive certificates for working adults. The company is headquartered outside of Washington D.C. at Strayer University's corporate office - 2303 Dulles Station Blvd, Herndon, VA 20171.

History
The Jack Welch Management Institute was developed in 2009 in partnership with Chancellor University. The partnership was made possible due to the relationship between Jack Welch and entrepreneur Michael Clifford. Welch initially invested $2 million to purchase a 12% share of the company running the university, Chancellor University Systems. In turn, Chancellor named the MBA program The Jack Welch Management Institute. 

Welch wanted to create a high-quality MBA program that will integrate his philosophy of leadership and human resources into a 12-course program. Welch infused his principles of candor, differentiation, voice and dignity, people-driven management, and authentic leadership into the curriculum.  

The institute launched in June 2009, and classes began in January 2010.

Acquisition by Strayer Education, Inc

In April 2011, Welch approached Robert Silberman, CEO and Chairman of Strayer Education, Inc., to discuss moving the institute to Strayer University.  Welch paid nearly $2 million to buy back his namesake and stated that "Chancellor wasn’t a good vehicle." Strayer Education, Inc purchased the Jack Welch Management Institute from Chancellor University in December 2011 for $7 million. Welch invested $2.8 million to Strayer Education as a representation of his economic interest in the program.

Academic programs

The institute offers an accredited Master of Business Administration, graduate certificates, and executive certificates covering various business-related topics through online classes. The online MBA can be completed in 18-months. The graduate certificates can be completed in 9 months and the executive certificates are 6-week programs. 

In March 2013, the institute launched a series of online, self-guided, self-paced management training programs under the Welch Way brand.

Welch developed the MBA curriculum, drawing from his management experience as CEO of GE and his experience teaching managers and executives at GE's Leadership Development Center. In addition to helping shape the program's curriculum, he held the title of distinguished professor at the institute.  He regularly addressed students via video stream and held video conferences with them at the end of each term.

Welch expected the relatively low tuition and flexible schedule for the institute's MBA program to make it attractive to those currently employed but wishing to earn an MBA.  He stated that he planned to grow the institute into the number one online business school in the world by 2016.

Accreditations 

 Accreditation Council for Business Schools and Programs (ACBSP) accreditation
 Middle States Commission on Higher Education (MSCHE) regional accreditation

Rankings

Quacquarelli Symonds 

 2020, Top Online MBA program ranked number 36 in the world.

Poets & Quants 
 2023, Best Online MBA program ranked number 6. 
 2022, Best Online MBA program ranked number 10. 
 2021, Best Online MBA program ranked number 20. 
 2020, Best Online MBA program ranked number 23. 
 2019, Best Online MBA program ranked number 11.

Princeton Review 

 2023, Top 50 Online MBA Program ranked number 7.
 2022, Top 50 Online MBA Program ranked number 10.
 2021, Top 50 Online MBA Program ranked number 15.  
 2020, Top 25 Online MBA Program ranked number 16.  
 2019, Top 25 Online MBA Program ranked number 18. 
 2018, Top 25 Online MBA Program ranked number 20. 
 2017, Top 25 Online MBA Program ranked number 22.

CEO Magazine 

 2022, Online MBA program ranked number 18 for global online rankings and number 3 for the top global online MBA program in North America. 
 2021, Online MBA program ranked number 19 for global online rankings and number 2 for the top global online MBA program in North America. 
 2020, Online MBA program ranked number 11 for global online rankings and number 2 for the top global online MBA program in North America. 
 2019, Online MBA program ranked number 10 for global online rankings and tied number 1 for the top global online MBA program in North America. 
 2018, Online MBA program ranked number 20 for global online rankings and number 5 for the top global online MBA program in North America. 
 2017, Online MBA program ranked number 12 for global online rankings and number 7 for the top global online MBA program in North America. 
 2016, Online MBA program tied for number 12 for global online rankings and tied number 5 for the top global online MBA program in North America.

Other Rankings 

 2015, Most influential education brand on LinkedIn.

References

External links
Jack Welch Management Institute official website

For-profit universities and colleges in the United States
Distance education institutions based in the United States
Educational institutions established in 2009
Business schools in the United States
Leadership training
2009 establishments in the United States